Joseph Charles Lambert (c. 1803 – 29 April 1875), generally referred to as J. C. Lambert, was an English comic actor who had a significant career in Australia.

History 
Lambert was born in Wells-next-the-Sea, Norfolk England,

He arrived in Australia around 1855, in which year he was playing in a farce, Shocking Events, at the Victoria Theatre, Sydney, although it is possible he appeared in Adelaide four years earlier.

He was a member of the consortium that leased the Theatre Royal, Melbourne 1866–1867.

He made a speciality of playing crusty old men: Sir Peter Teazle in The School for Scandal, Sir Anthony Absolute in The Rivals Sir John Vesey in Money.

He took his farewell bows on 27 February 1868 and left Australia by the ship Reigate on 21 March.

He died at his home "Buttlands", Wells-next-sea, Norfolk, England, of a heart complaint, which he attributed to a stage accident, when a fellow thespian playfully struck him on the chest, where he had secreted a bag of pebbles, as a stage prop for a bourse of gold.

Notes

References 

1803 births
1875 deaths
19th-century Australian male actors
Australian theatre managers and producers